The Ontario Libertarian Party ran five candidates in the 2003 Ontario provincial election. Relevant information about these candidates may be found on this page. The party originally planned to run two other candidates: Bill Turley in Durham and Paolo Fabrizio in Vaughan—King—Aurora. Both withdrew before the election. 

This page also provides information about Libertarian Party candidates in subsequent by-elections.

Nunzio Venuto (Davenport)
A portfolio administrator based in Toronto, Ontario. Was Toronto regional coordinator of the Libertarian Party of Canada in the late 1990s. Organized the 1999 Ontario Libertarian Party convention, and is currently Secretary of the OLP. Supports the principle of minimal government. Received 233 votes, the lowest total of any OLP candidate, finishing last in a field of seven candidates. The winning candidate was Tony Ruprecht of the Ontario Liberal Party.

Other candidacies:
 1993 Canadian federal election, received 200 votes in Davenport as a candidate of the Libertarian Party of Canada (winner: Charles Caccia, Liberal)
 1995 Ontario general election, received 100 votes in Oakwood (winner: Mike Colle, Liberal)
 1999 Ontario general election, received 95 votes in Davenport (winner: Tony Ruprecht, Liberal)

Kaye Sargent (Oxford)
Former leader of the Ontario Libertarian Party. See her biography page for further details. Received 306 votes, finishing last in a field of seven candidates. The winning candidate was Ernie Hardeman of the Progressive Conservative Party of Ontario.

Sam Apelbaum (Scarborough East)
Current party leader. See his biography page for further details. Received 285 votes, finishing last in a field of five candidates. The winning candidate was Mary Anne Chambers of the Ontario Liberal Party.

Philip Bender (Simcoe—Grey)
As of 2005, has lived in Erin, Ontario for sixteen years. 54 years old as of March 2005. Professional engineer, owns farm, and owns/manages an independent telephone company called Ability Telecom. Has an MBA and a Master's Degree in Biomedical Engineering, and is a Certified financial analyst. All of his degrees are from the University of Toronto. Serves on the Erin District high school council. Worked to bring internet access to rural areas in Erin, and is attempting to start a community radio station. Supports property rights, and opposes the proposed Greenbelt legislation of Dalton McGuinty's government. Received 411 votes, finishing last in a field of six candidates. The winning candidate was Jim Wilson of the Progressive Conservative Party of Ontario.

Other candidacies:
 provincial by-election, Dufferin—Peel—Wellington—Grey, March 17, 2005, received 135 votes [unofficial] (winner: John Tory, Progressive Conservative)

Judson Glober (Trinity—Spadina)
Glober was born and raised in Toronto, Ontario, and has degrees from McGill University in Montreal and American University in Washington, DC. He has worked as an international communications and strategy consultant, and is a former member of the Ontario Progressive Conservative Party youth executive committee.  He finished fifth of six candidates with 756 votes (1.86%), the best result of any Libertarian candidate in the province. The winning candidate was Rosario Marchese of the Ontario New Democratic Party.

By-elections

Marty Gobin (Whitby—Ajax, March 30, 2006)
Gobin (born September 21, 1987 in Ajax, Ontario ) was a law and security administration student during the election. He took legal action against the Government of Ontario in 2005, following the government's ban on pit bulls.

He campaigned for the Libertarian Party of Canada in the 2006 federal election, and opposed government funding for social programs, health care and post-secondary education during this campaign. He finished fifth with 274.

He spoke against provincial anti-smoking laws during the 2006 by-election.

Gobin ran in the race for Town Councillor for Ward 2 in his hometown of Whitby, Ontario in the 2006 municipal election. His promises included a pledge to lower a councillor's salary to $2000 per year and to give his entire salary to charity. He also promised to bring more doctors to the Whitby area. Gobin placed fourth of four candidates with 341 votes, 6.95% of the total.     He failed to gain enough signatures for the petition to run in the 2008 federal election.

Note: Italicized numbers refer to unofficial totals.

External links
 Libertarian Party of Canada
 Marty Gobin's Federal Candidate's Page

2003